Mahé, also known as Mayyazhi, is a small town in the Mahé district of the Puducherry Union Territory. It is situated at the mouth of the Mahé River and is surrounded by the State of Kerala. The Kannur District surrounds Mahé on three sides and Kozhikode District from one side.

Formerly part of French India, Mahé now forms a municipality in Mahé district, one of the four districts of the Union Territory of Puducherry. Mahé has one representative in the Puducherry Legislative Assembly.

Etymology
The name Mahé derives from  Mayyazhi, the name given to the local river and region in the Malayalam language.The original spelling found on French documents from the early 1720s is Mayé, with Mahé and Mahié also found on documents, maps and geographical dictionaries until the early 19th century when the spelling Mahé became the norm. Therefore, the belief that the name of the town was given in honour of Bertrand François Mahé de La Bourdonnais (1699–1753), whose later fame derived in good part from his association with India, including his capture of Mayé in 1741, is incorrect.

Another claim that the spelling Mahé was officially adopted by the leader of the expedition that retook the city in 1726 in recognition of La Bourdonnais' role at the time is also unlikely. It is probable that the resemblance of Mayé, not to mention Mahé, with La Bourdonnais' family name prompted later generations to assume that the famous Frenchman was somehow directly or indirectly associated with the name to the town or the spelling of the name.

History

Before the arrival of European trading companies to the Indian subcontinent, this area was part of Kolathu Nadu which comprised Tulunadu, Chirakkal and Kadathanadu. The French East India Company constructed a fort on the site of Mahé in 1724, in accordance with an accord concluded between André Mollandin and Raja Vazhunnavar of Vatakara three years earlier. In 1741, Mahé de La Bourdonnais retook the town after a short period of occupation by the Marathas.

In 1761 the British captured Mahé, and the settlement was handed over to the Rajah of Kadathanadu. The British restored Mahé to the French as a part of the 1763 Treaty of Paris. In 1779, the Anglo-French war broke out, resulting in the French loss of Mahé. In 1783, the British agreed to restore to the French their settlements in India, and Mahé was handed over to the French in 1785.

On the outbreak of the French Revolutionary Wars in 1793, a British force under James Hartley captured Mahé. In 1816 the British restored Mahé to the French as a part of the 1814 Treaty of Paris, after the conclusion of the Napoleonic Wars. Mayyazhi remained under French jurisdiction as a small French colony, an enclave within British India, during the long span that began in 1816. After the independence of India the area continued to be French-ruled until 13 June 1954, when a long anti-colonial struggle culminated in its joining the Indian Union (see Causes for liberation of French colonies in India).

After the French left, Mahé became a district of Puducherry Union Territory. The area of Mahé begins from Mayyazhi puzha in the north to Azhiyoor at the south. Mahé consists of Mahé town and Naluthara, which includes four villages: Pandakkal, Pallur, Chalakara and Chembra. The ruler of Kingdom of Mysore from the 1760s, Hyder Ali (ca 1722–1782), gifted Naluthara to the French as a token of appreciation for the assistance they provided in the war.

Liberation of Mahé
Gandhians like I. K. Kumaran led the struggle for union with India in Mahé after Indian independence in 1947. The municipal office of the French administration was attacked on 21 October 1948 at 9:00 PM. The French national flag was removed and the Indian national flag hoisted on the municipal building (Mairie in French). On 26 October, a French navy ship anchored in Mahé and the French regained control of Mahé. The ship left Mahé on 31 October. Communists tried to capture Cherukallayi enclave in April 1954. Two Indians were killed during the struggle. The Indian flag was hoisted in the Naluthura enclave on 1 May.  The freedom fighters conducted an embargo on Mahé from June that year. On 14 July 1954, the Mahajanasabha organized a march into Mahé, which was liberated on 16 July 1954.

Demographics
 India census, Mahé had a population of 41,816, predominantly Malayalis. Males constitute 46.5% of the population with Females constituting the remaining 54.5%. Mahé has an average literacy rate of 97.87%; male and female literacy were 98.63% and 97.25%, respectively. Both the Sex ratio (1184 females per 1000 male) and the literacy rates in Mahe are relatively higher compared to the rest of the nation. The national Sex ratio is 940 females per male and the literacy rate is at 74.04 per cent.

In Mahé, 10.89% of the population consists of children under six years of age. In 2011 census, Child sex ratio is 978 girls per 1000 boys compared to figure of 910 girls per 1000 boys of 2001 census data. In 2011, Children under 6 formed 10.89 percent of Mahe District compared to 11.34 percent of 2001. There was net decrease of 0.45 percent between 2011 and 2001.

The share of Hindus in population is 66.8% (27,940) and Muslims are 30.7% (12,856) as per 2011 Census of India. Christians account for 2.29% (958) of the population

Locationwise distribution
 Mahe	10630
 Chalakara	6855
 Pandakal	8944
 Palloor	14250
 Cherukallayi	1255

Culture
The culture and geography of this area are like almost all of those in the Malabar Coast of Kerala. There are only very few French language speakers in the town (less than 100). Only few influences of French is left in the area. These are mostly reflected in architecture and few old buildings. 

The major festival of this region is Vishu, Onam and Eid. The major language is Malayalam. The population also includes Arabic speakers too. The major religion is Hinduism 66.8% of populace practice this. 

The few places that upheld the rich French culture once prevalent in the area are:

- St. Teresa's Shrine, Mahé built in 1736

- Statue of Marianne situated in Tagore Park to commemorate French Revolution

- The Government House

- The River Walk

- The Light House

- Cherukallayi The St. George Fort ruins

Climate
Mahé has a tropical monsoon climate (Köppen Am), typical for the Kerala and Karnataka coast.

Transport

The nearest Railway Station is Mahe railway station, where a few local and express trains stop. The nearest major railway stations, where several long distance trains stop, are Thalassery, Kannur, Mangalore and Vatakara.

There are a few Puducherry Road Transport Corporation buses that operate in Mahe. Otherwise bulk of Public transport is managed by Kerala State Road Transport Corporation, private buses based in Malabar and Auto rickshaws.

Administration
Mahé Municipality is the seat of the local administration of Mahé. The Mahé municipal area comprises  with one Assembly Constituency, i.e. Mahé.  Municipal Council was not in existence with effect from 1978. Thereafter, the Regional Administrator or Regional Executive Officer used to exercise the power of the chairman and Vice-Chairman in the capacity of Special Officer of Mahé Municipal Council. Civic elections were held during 2006 after nearly 30 years. Based on the elections, the chairman and 15 councillors of Mahé Municipality were sworn in.

Divisions
 Mahé Town
 Cherukallayi
 Chalakkara
 Chembra
 Palloor
 Pandakkal

Wards
Mahé Municipality consists of 15 wards.

Mahé Pocket
 Mundock
 Manjakkal
 Choodikotta
 Parakkal
 Valavil

Naluthara Pocket
 Pandakkal North
 Pandakkal Central
 Pandakkal South
 Palloor North-East
 Palloor North-West
 Palloor South-West
 Palloor South-East
 Chalakkara North
 Chalakkara South

Cherukallayi Pocket
 Cherukallayi

Education
Mahatma Gandhi Government Arts College, Mahé, was established in the year 1970 by I K Kumaran. The Mahé Co-operative College of Teacher Education was established in 2005 and is part of the Mahé Co-operative Centre for Information Technology Ltd. Other institutions include Mahé Co-operative College of Higher Education & Technology, Mahé Institute of Dental Sciences & Hospital, Rajiv Gandhi Government Ayurveda College, Indira Gandhi Polytechnic College, Mahe and Rajiv Gandhi Govt Industrial Training Institute, Mahé.

The Pondicherry University Community College has a regional centre in Mahe.

There is a Jawahar Navodaya Vidyalaya (JNV Mahe) at Pandakkal.
There are four Govt. Higher Secondary Schools, Three High Schools, Two Middle School and Eight Lower Primary Schools, functioning in Mahe. The Higher Secondary Schools are affiliated to the Board of Higher Secondary Education, Govt. of Kerala and High Schools to the Board of Secondary Education, Government of Kerala. Out of the three High Schools one is a French Medium, the examinations of which are conducted by the Deputy Director of French Education, Govt. of Puducherry.

Banking facilities
The following banks provide banking facilities in Mahe.

Bank of India, Mahe
Canara Bank, Mahe II
Canara Bank, Mahe
ESAF Small Finance Bank Limited, Mahe
Federal Bank, Mahe
HDFC Bank, Mahe
Indian Bank, Mahe
North Malabar Gramin Bank, New Mahe
South Indian Bank, Mahe
State Bank Of India, Mahe
Syndicate Bank, Mahe
Uco Bank, Mahe
Union Bank of India, Mahe Branch

Notable people
 I. K. Kumaran, leader of French Indian Liberation Movement and the first Administrator of free Mahé
 M. Mukundan, Malayalam novelist and fiction writer.                            
 V. N. Purushothaman, the last Mayor and the first chairman of the Mahé Municipality.  
 Palery Dhamodharan Master, Former Principal,Founder and First President of  Alliance française MAHE         
 M. Night Shyamalan, American film director and screenwriter
Vellavil Kesavan,  freedom fighter, the First Mayor of Mahé Municipality and also an Member of the Legislative Assembly

In popular culture
M Mukundan's novel Mayyazhippuzhayude Theerangalil (transl. On the Banks of the River Mayyazhi) describes the political and social background of Mahé
1992 Malayalam feature film Daivathinte Vikrithikal, directed by Lenin Rajendran is based on the novel of the same name by M Mukundan, is set in the ex-French colony of Mayyazhi (Mahé)

See also

Image gallery

References

External links

 Mahe District Website - https://mahe.gov.in
Mahatma Gandhi Government Arts College, Mahe - Official website

 

Articles containing potentially dated statements from 2001
All articles containing potentially dated statements
Geography of Kannur district
Cities and towns in Mahe district
Geography of Puducherry